Pang Hseng, also known as Pan Saing, Kyu Koke and Kyu-hkök, is a town in Mu Se Township, Mu Se District, northern Shan State, Myanmar.

Geography
Pang Hseng lies 25 km west of Mong Ko (Monekoe) by the border with China, the nearest town being Wandingzhen (Wanting) to the north across the river. There is a border checkpoint in the town.

Further reading
 Shan (North) State, Myanmar - Mimu
 Map - Districts of Shan (North) State

References

External links
Google Map - Pang Hseng, Myanmar (Burma)
Photos

Populated places in Shan State
China–Myanmar border crossings